Eskmo is the debut studio album by Brendan Angelides as Eskmo. It was released through Ninja Tune in 2010. It has received generally favorable reviews from critics.

Critical reception

At Metacritic, which assigns a weighted average score out of 100 to reviews from mainstream critics, the album received an average score of 66, based on 10 reviews, indicating "generally favorable reviews".

Svein Brunstad of URB commented that "There's too much noise between the highlights, and even though he has his own signature production, you get tired of listen[ing] to the same industrial basslines and vocal mumblings ten times over." Brian Howe of Pitchfork wrote, "In particular, the record's home stretch is just kind of a mess, seeming to lose all regard for melodic and rhythmic center."

Track listing

Personnel
Credits adapted from liner notes.

 Brendan Angelides – vocals, production
 Twerk – mastering
 Khomatech – artwork

References

External links
 

2010 albums
Electronic albums by American artists
Ninja Tune albums